Mail, also marketed as Kambalapally Kathalu Chapter 1: Mail is a 2021 Indian Telugu-language comedy film written and directed by debutant Uday Gurrala and produced by Priyanka Dutt through Swapna Cinema production company. The film stars Priyadarshi and debutants Harshith Malgireddy, Mani Aegurla and Gouri Priya Reddy. Set in 2005 in the village of Kambalapally in Telangana, the film is the first installment in the Kambalapally Kathalu series. The film premiered on 12 January on Aha.

Plot 
Set in 2005 in the village of Kambalapally, Telangana, Ravi is an innocent degree student who is fascinated by computers. While computer and internet are new to the people in those times, Hybath opens an internet centre in the village. Ravi, who could not enroll himself in any computer course, requests Hybath to teach him how to operate a computer. Hybath reluctantly agrees on a liquor deal. Ravi borrows money from Shivanna, a local money lender to fund his expenses. Soon, Hybath creates a new e-mail account for Ravi. Meanwhile, Ravi has a crush on his classmate Roja, and vice versa. To pay back the money-lender, he borrows an anklet from her. He also gives her his e-mail ID, so that she could contact him. He checks his e-mail for her reply each day.

One day, Ravi receives a fraudulent e-mail of a lottery worth 2 crore. Ravi, unaware of the fraud, is all excited. He tells his friend Subbu about it. Further, Ravi receives another e-mail, asking him to send an amount of 1 lakh in order to process the lottery. On Subbu's persuasion, Ravi once again takes loan from Shivanna, mortgaging his father's land. He goes to the town, and sends the requested amount. Days go by but the lottery amount is nowhere to be seen. When Shivanna insists on returning the loan amount, they tell him about the lottery. He believes it and offers them more time. Later, when Hybath is informed about the lottery, he reveals that it is fake. Ravi and Subbu are shocked, now worrying about the loan.

Ravi and Subbu secretly meet a friend to seek his help on the situation. But he does not understand that the lottery is fake and keeps on asking when the amount would arrive. Subbu annoyingly replies that the amount would arrive on the last bus. Shivanna overhears the last bit and goes to the bus stop to seize the amount first. He runs away with a bag of the lone passenger on the last bus, but the villagers chase him. When he tries to flee on his moped, the bag falls off into the bushes.

The next morning, Ravi and Subbu arrive at Shivanna's place to confess about the fake lottery. However, Shivanna thinks that they were asking about his failed theft attempt. He hurriedly offers them some money in addition to waiving off the loan amount. In return, they should never speak about the incident, which they oblige.

Ravi buys a new computer with the amount. Shivanna searches for the bag in the bushes only to find it missing, as its already taken away by a shepherd.

Cast 

 Priyadarshi as Hybath
 Harshith Malgireddy as Ravi
 Mani Aegurla as Subbu
 Sri Gouri Priya as Roja
 Ravinder Bommakanti as Shivanna
 Srikanth Palle as Suresh
 Anusha Netha as Girija
 Anji Babu as Kanakaiah
 Yennengee as Mechanic Shakeel
 Ramesh Kumar as Ranaganna

Production 
The film was filmed in 2020, but was delayed to release due to the COVID-19 pandemic.

Music

Reception 

Thadhagath Pathi of The Times of India stated: "Mail is a sweet watch if nostalgic, rural dramas are your thing." On performances, Pathi wrote, "Harshit looks good on-screen and he pulls off the innocence of his character well. Mani is hilarious as the best friend and Gouri Priya is beautiful, delivering a subtle performance. Priyadarshi is unsurprisingly good, delivering a performance that's required of him."

Sangeetha Devi Dundoo in a review for The Hindu called it "A bittersweet tech story." She added that "Mail is indie-spirited and has its heart at the right place. It isn't completely engrossing; there are places I wish the story moved a little faster. The rooted milieu and the performances make up for it. Ravinder Bommakanti as the moneylender Shivanna and the other smaller rural characters are all well cast. The panchayat debate on computer virus and what follows is fun." Pratyush Parasuraman of Film Companion wrote "The tone of the 2-hour film is neither entirely serious, nor entirely satirical, showing only strains of both. "

Accolades

Notes

References

External links 

 

2021 films
2021 comedy films
Films set in 2005
Films set in Telangana
Films shot in Telangana
2021 directorial debut films
2021 direct-to-video films
2020s Telugu-language films
Aha (streaming service) original films
Films about technology